"Goo Goo Gai Pan" is the twelfth episode of the sixteenth season of the American animated television series The Simpsons. It originally aired on the Fox network in the United States on March 13, 2005. The episode focuses on Selma Bouvier adopting a Chinese orphan after experiencing menopause. Lucy Liu guest stars. The original closing credits feature the show's director David Silverman giving viewers a quick lesson on how he draws Bart Simpson. The episode was banned in China and Hong Kong.

Plot
While giving Mr. Burns a driving test to replace his long-expired license, Selma experiences a hot flash and is taken to the hospital. Dr. Hibbert explains (using a video featuring Robert Wagner) that she has entered menopause, meaning she can no longer have children. Selma fears growing old alone, so Patty suggests that she adopt a child. She almost manages to adopt one of Cletus's many babies through a misunderstanding, but that fails when Brandine wants the baby back. Lisa suggests adopting a child from China. Since the Chinese government only allows married couples to adopt, Selma puts on her application that she's married to Homer Simpson.

Selma sponsors a trip to China for the Simpsons. When Selma informs Homer that he must pretend to be her husband, he is shocked and reluctant, but later decides to do it for Marge. When they arrive in China, Selma claims Bart and Lisa are her children, while Marge is their nanny, ″Ms. October.″ The Chinese adoption agent, Madam Wu, tells them they will get a baby in a few days, as she wants to detail the "marriage relationship" between Homer and Selma, much to both Homer and Selma's dismay. The family then spends time touring through several landmarks in China, including visiting the mummified body of Mao Zedong, whom Homer likens to a "little angel who killed 50 million people." Selma eventually gets a daughter, whom she names Ling. Having lied to Wu on a whim about being an acrobat, Homer is forced into substituting for a performer in a Chinese acrobatics display, being hospitalized after unwittingly pulling off the stunt successfully. Following Selma's adoption, the ruse is quickly revealed when Wu catches Homer and Marge kissing and talking about the false marriage whilst spying on Homer's hospital room.

As they are about to leave for Springfield, Wu angrily arrives and takes Ling away, stating that Homer and Selma are not married. As the Simpsons try to console her, Lisa plots with them to get the baby back. At the nursery, they dress and spray-paint Homer to look like a cross-legged golden Buddha statue. According to the customs of feng shui, the Buddha statue must be taken indoors, so Chinese guards drag him into the nursery (by his nose with a hook). When the guards leave, Homer goes inside the nursery and grabs Ling.

The Simpsons, Selma and Ling pass through Tiananmen Square, a place where, according to the marker shown in the episode, "nothing happened" in 1989. Wu, in a Type 59 Tank, confronts them and demands the baby back in a way similar to the tanks confronting the Tank Man. After an impassioned speech from Selma and Homer, Wu then agrees to allow Selma to adopt Ling as a single parent—her leniency stemming from the fact that when she herself was just a baby, her father choked to death on a Ping-Pong ball the day before the Heimlich maneuver was invented, and her mother had ultimately raised her as a single parent. Wu also stops Homer from smuggling a panda cub in his luggage.

Selma and her new daughter, Ling, and the Simpsons depart China by junk except for Bart, who is replaced by a Chinese child spy masquerading as him to deceive Homer. The episode ends with three dragons flying in the sky and singing while playing an erhu.

During the credits, David Silverman shows the viewers how to draw Bart.

Unavailability in Hong Kong 

In 2021, Disney+ on which The Simpsons is available was launched in Hong Kong on November 16, 2021. Disney+ subscribers in Hong Kong have noted that the episode "Goo Goo Gai Pan" is not available in that region. It was removed due to references to the 1989 Tiananmen Square massacre in Beijing.

Reviews 
Robert Canning of IGN wrote: The plot is simple. Selma is diagnosed with menopause and decides that since she can no longer have her own baby, she'll adopt one. ("The adoption process! That'll end heartbreak.") After a failed attempt, Lisa suggests her aunt try China. When filling out the forms, Selma is told only married couples are allowed to adopt, so she writes down Homer's name for her husband. She tells the official, "Homer Simpson is my whole world. I love him." Across town at the nuclear power plant, Homer shudders, stating, "A chill just went through my very soul." It's a classic mismatched set up, straight out of IGN's TV Playbook. Unfortunately, when they arrive in China for observation, the comedy doesn't really come from the unlikelihood of Homer and Selma as husband and wife, but from numerous random jokes about all things Chinese.

References

External links 
 

The Simpsons (season 16) episodes
2005 American television episodes
Television episodes set in Beijing
Cultural depictions of Mao Zedong
Television episodes about adoption
Television episodes about communism
Television censorship in China